is a UK labour law case concerning the scope of protection for people to employment rights. It took the view that an agency worker did have an employment contract for the purpose of claiming for unpaid wages on an employer's insolvency.

Facts
Mr McMeechan claimed £105.17 for four days of unpaid wages from the National Insurance Fund, via the Secretary of State for Employment, after his employment agency went insolvent under the Employment Protection (Consolidation) Act 1978 section 122 (now the ERA 1996 section 182). Mr McMeechan worked as a caterer, through an employment agency named Noel Employment Ltd, for Sutcliffe Catering in Swindon. He had no written contract, but received a job description for each work assignment. He had agreed ‘to fulfil the normal common law duties which an employee would owe to an employer so far as they are applicable’ The Department of Employment refused his claim, saying he was an ‘independent contractor’.

The Employment Tribunal held he was not an employee, and so was not entitled to claim. Mummery J in the Employment Appeal Tribunal held he was an employee of the employment agency. The Secretary of State appealed.

Judgment
Waite LJ held that Mr McMeechan was an employee of the agency for this period and so he could claim from the Secretary of State for unpaid wages.

Potter LJ and McCowan LJ agreed.

See also

Contract of employment in English law
UK labour law
UK insolvency law
EU labour law
US labor law
German labour law

Notes

References

United Kingdom labour case law
Court of Appeal (England and Wales) cases
1996 in case law
1996 in British law